Al Miller may refer to:

Al Miller (racing driver, born 1907) (1907–1967), American racecar driver active in the 1930s and 1940s
Al Miller (racing driver, born 1921) (1921–1978), American racecar driver active in the 1960s
Al Miller (soccer) (born 1936), former U.S. collegiate and professional soccer coach
Alfred Henry Miller (1904–1967), also known as Al Miller, American football player
Al Miller (1927-2000), American drummer, bigband leader, drum teacher, author

See also
Alfred Miller (disambiguation)
Al Millar (1929–1987), ice hockey player
Alan Miller (disambiguation)
Albert Miller (disambiguation)